Psichiologia de ratione animae humanae (Croatian: Psihologija, o naravi ljudske duše) is a work by Croatian Renaissance humanist Marko Marulić written between 1510 and 1517. It is the earliest known literary reference to "psychology" in the history of the discipline.

References 

Croatian literature